"14 Minutes Until Start", also known as "I Believe, My Friends" is a popular Soviet and Russian mass song composed in 1960 by Oscar Feltsman, to lyrics by Vladimir Voinovich. The song was written as an unofficial anthem for the Soviet Space Program, and became a popular fixture of Space Race-era Soviet propaganda, being printed several times in Pravda and even being sung in space by cosmonauts Andriyan Nikolayev and Pavel Popovich during the Vostok 3 mission.

Creation
"14 Minutes Until Start" was written in autumn 1960 by Vladimir Voinovich, a relatively unknown Soviet author at the time, during his six months working as a writer for All-Union Radio. In late 1960, the Soviet government requested that a song be written to commemorate the Vostok 1 mission, which was scheduled for launch in mid-1961. In his biography Design, Voinovich claims that he was the only worker at the All-Union Radio to volunteer to write lyrics for the piece, and, with help from Oscar Feltsman, the song was completed within less than a week of the order. The song was not widely distributed in the Soviet Union until after the success of the Vostok 1 mission, but became an almost obligatory addition to any space-related musical repertoire afterwards. The song peaked in popularity in summer 1962, when it was sung aboard the Vostok 3 spaceflight by cosmonauts Andriyan Nikolayev and Pavel Popovich, as well as at when the crew of Vostok 3 were received by Nikita Khrushchev after the mission.

Censorship and criticism
Several alterations were made to the lyrics of "14 Minutes Until Start" after its release. One of the first changes was the alteration of the lyric 'blue planet', which was altered to 'planet dear' almost immediately after being submitted to the Ministry of Culture for editing. The exact reason why this lyric was changed remains unknown. Another attempted alteration to the lyrics was the term 'dusty paths', which was criticised by Soviet censors as 'deromanticising the image of space'. It was proposed that the term 'new paths' be used instead, but ultimately, Voinovich refused to change the lyric. In his biography, Voinovich defended his word choice by stating that any cosmic path would be dusty because 'there are no wipers in space', and that using the term 'new paths' implied that there were pre-existing old paths. The lyric 'dusty paths' was kept in the final version, although Voinovich allegedly continued to receive phone calls after the song was published urging him to alter the wording.

Another criticism of Voinovich's lyrics came from cosmonaut Pavel Popovich, who requested that the lyric 'Let's have a smoke before the start' be altered to 'Let's sing before the start', on account of the fact that cosmonauts were forbidden to smoke. Voinovich responded to the criticism by saying that, as long as he did not tell Popovich how to fly a spacecraft, Popovich had no right to tell him how to write song lyrics. The lyric ultimately remained unchanged.

In 1974, Voinovich was expelled from the Union of Soviet Writers, and subsequently exiled from the USSR six years later. After his expulsion, the use of "14 Minutes Until Start" drastically decreased, although this decrease in broadcast coincided with a general decrease in Soviet space exploration. "14 Minutes Until Start" remains a moderately popular song in Russia today, and has spawned several contemporary parodies.

See also
Mass song
Soviet Space Program
Vostok 1
Vostok 3
Vladimir Voinovich
Soviet music

References

External links 
 

1960 songs
Propaganda in the Soviet Union
Songs about spaceflight
Soviet songs
Space program of the Soviet Union